James Alexander Arnold (born 6 August 1950) is an English former football goalkeeper, noted for his highly intelligent positional ability. He made 165 league appearances in a seven-year career in the English Football League.

He arrived in the professional game in 1979, at the late age of 29, when he signed with Blackburn Rovers from Stafford Rangers. Two years, one promotion out of the Third Division, and 58 league appearances later, he moved on to Everton. He spent four years as Everton's back-up keeper, as the club won the First Division title and the UEFA Cup Winners' Cup. He was loaned out to Preston North End during the 1982–83 campaign, and signed with Port Vale in August 1985. Voted the club's Player of the Year in 1985–86, he announced his retirement from full-time football in November 1986. He did though later turn out for non-league sides Kidderminster Harriers, Rocester and Workington. He won the FA Trophy with Stafford Rangers and Workington.

Career

Early career
After leaving Rising Brook, Arnold played for non-league Stafford Rangers, and also appeared on loan for the Sandbach Ramblers. During his time at Stafford Rangers he appeared in two separate FA Trophy finals at Wembley. In 1976 Stafford lost to Scarborough 3–2 after extra-time; Arnold saved a John Woodhall penalty in this match. In the 1979 final Arnold played as Stafford beat Kettering Town 2–0. He was signed by Blackburn Rovers manager Howard Kendall in 1979 to provide competition for John Butcher and went on to make his Football League debut at the age of 29. Arnold kept a club record nineteen clean sheets in 1979–80, as Rovers won promotion out of the Third Division as runners-up, with only the top two clubs in the English Football League, Liverpool and Manchester United, conceding fewer than 36 league goals. Despite Arnold missing three months with a groin injury, just 29 league goals were conceded in 1980–81, a record only beaten by Lincoln City, as Rovers missed out on promotion from the Second Division by just three points.

Everton
Howard Kendall was appointed manager at First Division club Everton in August 1981, and he quickly signed Arnold for a £200,000 fee. However Neville Southall soon proved to be superior goalkeeper as the "Toffees" finished eighth in 1981–82, and seventh in 1982–83 and 1983–84. Arnold spent some of the 1983–84 campaign on loan at Alan Kelly's Preston North End, and played six games for the Third Division club. He was an unused substitute in the 1984 FA Charity Shield, which Everton won with a 1–0 victory over Merseyside derby rivals Liverpool. Everton went on to win the league title in 1984–85 by a massive thirteen point margin. However Arnold was not the first choice keeper, and made only 48 league appearances for the club in his four years at Goodison Park. One of his final actions for the club was to sit on the bench for the 1985 European Cup Winners' Cup Final win against SK Rapid Wien.

Port Vale
Arnold signed for John Rudge's Port Vale in August 1985. He played 52 games in 1985–86, and conceded just 37 league goals as the "Valiants" won promotion out of the Fourth Division. For his performances he was awarded the club's Player of the Year award. However, he went into retirement in the summer, joining Staffordshire Police as a recreation officer. He did though return to Vale Park on a non-contract basis in September 1986 after Mark Grew picked up a knee injury; this crisis was resolved in November 1986, when Vale signed Alex Williams, and so Arnold stepped down once more, having played fifteen games of the 1986–87 campaign.

Later career
Arnold also went on to play for local non-league sides Kidderminster Harriers, Rocester and Workington. While with Kidderminster, Arnold featured in the 1987 FA Trophy final versus Burton Albion. After a 0–0 draw at Wembley, Arnold saved a penalty in the replay at The Hawthorns, which Harriers won 2–1.

Style of play
He was a shot-stopping goalkeeper, who mostly remained on his line and relied on his defenders to deal with crosses; former Port Vale teammate Robbie Earle stated that "you could not wish to meet a nicer, more level-headed fella".

Later life
Arnold settled in Staffordshire and joined Staffordshire Police as a recreation officer.

Career statistics
Source:

Honours
Individual
Port Vale F.C. Player of the Year: 1985–86

Stafford Rangers 
FA Trophy: 1979; runner-up: 1976

Blackburn Rovers
Football League Third Division second-place promotion: 1979–80

Everton
FA Charity Shield: 1984
Football League First Division: 1984–85
UEFA Cup Winners' Cup: 1985

Port Vale
Football League Fourth Division fourth-place promotion: 1985–86

Kidderminster Harriers
FA Trophy: 1987

References

Sportspeople from Stafford
English footballers
England semi-pro international footballers
Association football goalkeepers
Stafford Rangers F.C. players
Blackburn Rovers F.C. players
Everton F.C. players
Preston North End F.C. players
Port Vale F.C. players
Kidderminster Harriers F.C. players
Rocester F.C. players
Workington A.F.C. players
Northern Premier League players
English Football League players
National League (English football) players
1950 births
Living people